Aldy María Bernard Bonilla (born 5 July 1995) is a Dominican model and beauty pageant titleholder who was crowned Miss Dominican Republic 2018. She represented Dominican Republic at the Miss Universe 2018 pageant.

Pageantry

Miss Dominican Republic 2018
Bernard was crowned as Miss Dominican Republic 2018 on 26 August 2018 at the Gran Arena del Cibao, Santiago de los Caballeros. She succeeded outgoing Miss Dominican Republic 2017 Carmen Muñoz Guzmán.

References

External links

1995 births
Living people
Miss Universe 2018 contestants
People from Laguna Salada
Dominican Republic female models
Dominican Republic beauty pageant winners